155 (Wessex) Transport Regiment, Royal Logistic Corps, was a regiment in the United Kingdom's Territorial Army that was initially formed in 1967 and disbanded in 2014.

History
The regiment was first formed in the Royal Corps of Transport as 155th (Wessex) Regiment, RCT (Volunteers) in 1967. It was disbanded in 1993 but re-formed in the Royal Logistic Corps as 155th (Wessex) Transport Regiment, RLC (Volunteers) in 2006. It disbanded under Army 2020, with 232 Transport Squadron re-roling to a Port Squadron and then moving to 165 Port and Maritime Regiment RLC.

Structure
The final structure was as follows:
 241 HQ Squadron
 232 Squadron
 233 Squadron
 245 Squadron

References

Regiments of the Royal Corps of Transport
Regiments of the Royal Logistic Corps
Military units and formations established in 1967